Conella ovulata is a species of sea snail, a marine gastropod mollusk in the family Columbellidae, the dove snails.

Description

Distribution

References

Columbellidae
Taxa named by Jean-Baptiste Lamarck
Gastropods described in 1822